Phoenix Airport may refer to:

Phoenix, Arizona#Air, for airports within the metro area of Phoenix, Arizona, United States:
Phoenix Sky Harbor International Airport
Phoenix Deer Valley Airport
Phoenix Goodyear Airport
Phoenix-Mesa Gateway Airport
Sanya Phoenix International Airport in Sanya, Hainan, China